Robert Lee Oliver (June 17, 1947 – June 28, 2013) was American football defensive end who played one season with the Cleveland Browns of the National Football League (NFL). He was drafted by the Browns in the 17th round of the 1969 NFL Draft. He played college football at Abilene Christian University and attended Albany High School in Albany, Texas. Oliver died of cancer on June 28, 2013 in Abilene, Texas.

Professional career
Oliver was selected by the Cleveland Browns of the NFL with the 436th pick in the 1969 NFL Draft. He played in eight games for the Browns in 1969. He was released by the Browns in late August 1970.

References

External links
Just Sports Stats

2013 deaths
1947 births
Players of American football from Texas
American football defensive ends
Abilene Christian Wildcats football players
Cleveland Browns players
People from Olney, Texas
Deaths from cancer in Texas